Miladin Bečanović (Cyrillic: Миладин Бечановић; born 18 April 1973) is a Montenegrin retired professional footballer who played as a striker.

Club career

Lille
Bečanović joined French club Lille ahead of the 1995-96 season. In his second season with Lille, he was the team's top scorer, having scored 13 goals over the course of the season. However, Lille was still relegated to the French second division at the end of the season.

Partizan
After joining in 2000, Bečanović contributed to Partizan winning the league over two consecutive seasons in 2002 and 2003. Under coach Ljubiša Tumbaković, he shared a striker partnership with a friend from his own hometown, Andrija Delibašić. On 10 March 2001, he scored the goal in a 1–0 away win against Budućnost in front of an audience of 7,000 people. Four days later, he scored a brace against Radnički Kragujevac and was named player of the match after Partizan won 4–0. On 5 May 2001, he scored the first goal in a 3–4 away win against his former team, Sutjeska Nikšić. In addition to his first season at Partizan, he also contributed to the team's successful 2001 Yugoslav Cup campaign. He played in the final against Red Star Belgrade on 9 May 2001, which Partizan won 1–0 at Red Star's stadium.

On 7 December 2001 he scored a brace in a 3–1 win against Obilić, but suffered a broken nose after scoring the second goal.

References

External links
 

1973 births
Living people
Footballers from Nikšić
Association football forwards
Yugoslav footballers
Montenegrin footballers
Serbia and Montenegro footballers
FK Sutjeska Nikšić players
Iraklis Thessaloniki F.C. players
Lille OSC players
Olympique de Marseille players
Le Havre AC players
FK Partizan players
US Créteil-Lusitanos players
FC Sion players
Panserraikos F.C. players
Yugoslav First League players
First League of Serbia and Montenegro players
Super League Greece players
Ligue 1 players
Ligue 2 players
Swiss Challenge League players
Football League (Greece) players
Serbia and Montenegro expatriate footballers
Expatriate footballers in Greece
Serbia and Montenegro expatriate sportspeople in Greece
Expatriate footballers in France
Serbia and Montenegro expatriate sportspeople in France
Expatriate footballers in Switzerland
Serbia and Montenegro expatriate sportspeople in Switzerland